Gurudwara Baba Gurditta Ji is a Sikh temple (gurdwara) in the village of Chandpur Rurki of Nawanshahr District in Indian Punjab. The gurudwara is situated at the entrance of the village and about 1.5 km from Garhshankar-Anandpur Sahib link highway. It was built in memory of Baba Gurditta and Baba Kesra Singh Ji.

Famous visitors

Gurudwara Baba Gurditta Ji is a historical and holy place for Sikhism. Baba Gurditta Ji visited Chandpur Rurki with two associates. They stayed one night along with their horse. This Gurudwara has two Samadhis for two associates, held in main Gurudwara Sahib Ji. Herein Baba Ji traveled on horseback along with two associates, and took rest here. The chain with which they tied their horse is still visible in Gurudwara Sahib.

Events and celebrations 

All events, functions and ceremonies that take place at the Gurudwara have always been started with remembrances to Baba Gurditta Ji. A phrase frequently used there is "Dhan-Dhan Baba Gurditta ji, Deen Dunia Da Tika Ji, Jo Var Mangya, So Var Dita Ji". Another Gurudwara where Baba Gurditta is celebrated is at Kiratpur Sahib.

Two annual events are associated with this Gurudwara.

Nishan Sahib
The Nishan Sahib ritual flag is celebrated on the occasion of Sankranti in August. During this event, a new Nishan Sahib is made, lasts for at least two to three days and is begun with Bhog observances centred on Akhand Path recital. Residents of this village engage in Sewa at this time. After Nishan Sahib, a holy kirtan is performed and all the worshippers (sangat) follow, singing the holy shabds.

Birthday of Baba Gurditta Ji 
The second celebration is for the birthday of Baba Gurditta Ji. This function is  celebrated on 24 November. During the celebration the Bhog ceremony is made, after which the holy dish 'Karah Parshad' is served to all attendees inside Gurudwara Hall as well as among outside Sewadars. A kirtan is then performed, shabads are sung and donations are given. 

After noon, special food, Guru's Langar, is ready to serve. This langar is distributed among the people. An announcement is made to all villagers and visitors to take the holy food. The previous day, a large nagar kirtan procession visits nearby villages and finishes at Gurudwara Sahib Ji.

GURUDAWARA BABA GURDITTA JI
AT VILL: CHANDPUR RURKI

‘Bhadon’ is an auspicious month of the year, & ‘Bhadon Sangrand’ is celebrated with a lot of fervour in the village of Chandpur Rurki in District Nawanshahar, Punjab. Not only the residents of the village but ‘sangat’ from all surrounding area throng the Gurudwara Sahib on ‘sangrand’ to pay obeisance at the sacred place. It is believed that during the life span of Baba Gurditta ji, he spent many years here & culminated his ‘tapasaya’ on the auspicious day of ‘bhadon sangrand’.
The ‘sangat’ has built a huge gurudwara at the site & each ‘sangrand’ is celebrated with lot of reverence. It is believed that Baba Mangal Singh, who was a devout Sikh belonging to Chak 116, Sahiwal district (now Pakistan) took upon himself the ‘sewa’ to build the gurudwara at the current site in the year 1843-45. He belonged to a well to do agricultural family famously known as ‘Oonthwalas’. (Atwals used to husband camels and hence came to be known as oonthwalas). 
Baba Mangal Singh served in the Khalsa Durbar army of Maharaja Ranjit Singh and after the first Anglo- Sikh war, it seems that on the ‘hukaknama of the ‘Akal Purakh’ he headed to the village of Chandpur Rurki with the purpose to build Gurudwara Baba Gurditta ji. His grandson Sardar Sant Singh, who became a senior government officer, further upgraded the premises. Baba Mangal Singh and his decedents were the first Sikhs to settle in the village, which is located in the Kandi area of Shivalik foothills. 
Though his descendants have moved to cities in India and overseas, as and when possible they make it a point to visit their ancestral village and the Gurudwara. They have been big donors in the gurudwara sewa, donated land to the village school and also built a community centre in the village.
The gurudwara is managed by Sehajdhari Sikhs & during the ‘sangrand’ festivity every household, all men, women & children of the village work with utmost faith in preparing ‘langar’ and manage thousands of devotes. Free medical check-up camps for the sangat are also arranged on the auspicious day.

References

External links 
   www.babagurdittaji.com 
 WN.com
 Wikimapia.org
 Gallery.sikhsangeet.com
 allaboutsikhs.com
 worldgurudwaras.com

Gurdwaras in Punjab, India

GURUDAWARA BABA GURDITTA JI
AT VILL: CHANDPUR RURKI

‘Bhadon’ is an auspicious month of the year, & ‘Bhadon Sangrand’ is celebrated with a lot of fervour in the village of Chandpur Rurki in District Nawanshahar, Punjab. Not only the residents of the village but ‘sangat’ from all surrounding area throng the Gurudwara Sahib on ‘sangrand’ to pay obeisance at the sacred place. It is believed that during the life span of Baba Gurditta ji, he spent many years here & culminated his ‘tapasaya’ on the auspicious day of ‘bhadon sangrand’.
The ‘sangat’ has built a huge gurudwara at the site & each ‘sangrand’ is celebrated with lot of reverence. It is believed that Baba Mangal Singh, who was a devout Sikh belonging to Chak 116, Sahiwal district (now Pakistan) took upon himself the ‘sewa’ to build the gurudwara at the current site in the year 1843-45. He belonged to a well to do agricultural family famously known as ‘Oonthwalas’. (Atwals used to husband camels and hence came to be known as oonthwalas). 
Baba Mangal Singh served in the Khalsa Durbar army of Maharaja Ranjit Singh and after the first Anglo- Sikh war, it seems that on the ‘hukaknama of the ‘Akal Purakh’ he headed to the village of Chandpur Rurki with the purpose to build Gurudwara Baba Gurditta ji. His grandson Sardar Sant Singh, who became a senior government officer, further upgraded the premises. Baba Mangal Singh and his decedents were the first Sikhs to settle in the village, which is located in the Kandi area of Shivalik foothills. 
Though his descendants have moved to cities in India and overseas, as and when possible they make it a point to visit their ancestral village and the Gurudwara. They have been big donors in the gurudwara sewa, donated land to the village school and also built a community centre in the village.
The gurudwara is managed by Sehajdhari Sikhs & during the ‘sangrand’ festivity every household, all men, women & children of the village work with utmost faith in preparing ‘langar’ and manage thousands of devotes. Free medical check-up camps for the sangat are also arranged on the auspicious day.